Aeta Adelaide Lamb (1886–June 1928) was one of the longest serving organizers in the Women's Social and Political Union (WSPU), the leading militant organization campaigning for Women's suffrage in the United Kingdom.

Early life and education
Lamb was born in Demerara in British Guiana, and named after a palm that her father, the botanist William Davis Lamb, had discovered there.  Her father died when she was a child, and Aeta, her two siblings and her mother Adelaide, daughter of General Henry Nicoll, CB returned to live in England. She attended Notting Hill High School between 1898-1899.

WPSU work

She joined the WSPU in 1906 – she was noted to be very eloquent and she wrote some of Christabel Pankhurst's speeches while working in its information department, even being said to be the 'real brains' behind some of her best known rhetoric. In October 1906 she took part in a deputation to the House of Commons and was arrested, but ultimately released after her mother paid her fine. Despite this, she took part in another deputation in February/March 1907, and another in October 1908, resulting in prison terms of a week, then a month, served in Holloway Prison.

In July 1907 she assisted with by-election campaign in North West Staffordshire alongside Annie Kenney and August 1907 in Bury St Edmunds alongside Emmeline Pankhurst, following which she was appointed as a national WSPU organizer in October 1907 while working with Miss Kenney in Bristol. Lamb was arrested with Patricia Woodlock and Emily Sproson and over 50 others, reported in the Evening Express.

In January 1908, she was again assisting Emmeline Pankhurst, this time at the Mid-Devon by-election, and then at the Herefordshire (Ross) by election.  From there she was one of the main organizers the first meeting of the Bath branch of the WSPU in April 1908. It was here also that she got to know the Blathwayt family of Eagle House, Batheaston, which they operated as a home of refuge for suffragettes between 1908 and 1912. In 1911, Lamb was one of the last WSPU members to go there, planting a commemorative tree in their arboretum which they had named the 'Suffragette's Rest', before the Blathwayts withdrew their support due to the militancy of the organization.
In April 1908 she helped Mary Gawthorpe in the Kincardineshire by-election campaign, after which she went on to help in the Montrose Burghs, Dundee and Stirling Burghs  by election campaigns in May, and then another in Pudsey in June 1908.  After these campaigns, her health and stamina began to fail, so she returned to London to work at the WSPU headquarters at Clement's Inn until the outbreak of the Great War, becoming one of its longest serving organizers.  One of her last duties was to draw up a list of suffragette prisoners for use in the campaign - by the time of its completion it contained over 1,200 documents relevant to the arrest of over 450 suffragettes.

She remained loyal to the WSPU throughout its campaign, despite developing increasing misgivings of its policies of violent protest over the course of her time with them.

Later career and death
During the War she worked in War Depots, and afterwards was largely unsuccessful in finding gainful employment, despite learning shorthand, typing, and even cookery.  She died of cancer at the Elizabeth Garrett Anderson Hospital at the age of 41 years.

References

Other sources

Aeta Lamb biography (by Vera Douie) in The Suffragette Fellowship Collection, Museum of London

External links

1886 births
1928 deaths
People educated at Notting Hill & Ealing High School
Eagle House suffragettes